Workers Development Union (Shramik Abhivrudhi Sangh) also known as Jana Jagran  is the social action wing and a non government organization of the Goa Jesuits, with activities concentrated in Belgaum and other districts of north Karnataka and in the Kolhapur district of Maharashtra.

The Union has a shepherd training program in sheep care, modern medicines and modern breeding practices carried on in the largely pastoral northern districts of Karnataka.
In 1996 SAS helped local women produce and market handbags and other handicrafts made of jute and cotton fibre. In 2005 SAS teamed with the Swiss Agency for Development and Cooperation and helped Kuruba women in the Belgaum district in Karnataka to make and market wool products from sheep on the Deccan Plateau.

References  

Jesuit development centres
Development charities based in India
Organisations based in Goa
Rural development in India
Poverty-related organizations
Non-profit organisations based in India
Women's rights in India
Community-building organizations
Social welfare charities
Development studies
Cultural promotion organizations
Year of establishment missing